The 2021 World Modern Pentathlon Championships was held from 8 to 14 June 2021 in Cairo, Egypt.

Originally championships were meant to be held in Minsk, Belarus, but due instability in Belarus championships been moved to Egypt.

Medal table

Medal summary

Men

Women

Mixed

References

World Modern Pentathlon Championships
World Championships
2021 in Egyptian sport
International sports competitions hosted by Egypt
Sports competitions in Cairo
World Modern Pentathlon Championships